63 Andromedae (abbreviated 63 And) is an Alpha2 Canum Venaticorum (α2 CVn) variable star in the constellation Andromeda. Its variable star designation is PZ Andromedae. With an apparent magnitude of about 5.6, it is bright enough to be seen by naked eye.

The spectral type of this star is B9VpSi, indicating that it is a chemically peculiar main sequence star with abnormally strong silicon lines.  Although it has a B-type spectral class, this type of star is known as an Ap star, a class of stars with very strong spectral lines of certain heavy elements and strong magnetic fields.  The chemical peculiarities are caused by stratification in the atmosphere due to slow rotation.

The star has 3 times the mass of the Sun and 2.4 times the Sun's radius. It is radiating 110 times the Sun's luminosity from its photosphere at an effective temperature of 11,967 K.

63 Andromedae varies in brightness by about 0.05 magnitudes with a period of 4.189 days.  This is believed to occur as it rotates. This type of variable star is known as an α2 Canum Venaticorum variable after the first example to be studied.

To the naked eye the star figures as a faint, dense asterism with 64 and 65 Andromedae (southwest and west), which together justify a rectangular projection (extreme) of the constellation (official boundaries). North, west and east are an arm/hand, fictitiously and geometrically, of Perseus, whose character is related in traditional mythology as Andromeda's saviour, saving her from the sea monster, who forever retreats to beyond Pisces, Cetus. The closest star in the asterisms commonly drawn up to represent the princess herself is 51 Andromedae, to the east.  At an apparent magnitude of 3.57, this star shines two magnitudes or 6.3 times brighter.

References

External links
 Image 63 Andromedae

B-type main-sequence stars
Alpha2 Canum Venaticorum variables
Andromeda (constellation)
BD+49 0640
Andromedae, 63
014392
010944
0682
Andromedae, PZ
Ap stars